John Wolcott Adams (1874–1925) was an American illustrator.

Biography
Adams was born on 7 November 1874 in Worcester, Massachusetts. He married Frances Pendleton Sheldon (1903–1920).  John Wolcott Adams was the son of John Francis and Ellen Wilson Adams and descendant of a New England family. This family had produced two United States presidents. Adams was interested in the theatre, and he was able to design at least one stage setting that was designed for a 1923 Walter Hampden production.

He died in New York on June 24, 1925, of appendicitis.

Education
John Wolcott Adams studied at the School of the Museum of Fine Arts in Boston, and in 1898 he went to New York where he attended the Art Students League of New York classes.

Groups
John Wolcott Adams was a member of the following groups:
The Players
The Dutch Treat Club
The Society of Illustrators

Works
John Wolcott Adams contributed to the following periodicals:
Everybody's Success
Youth's Companion
Saturday Evening Post
Delineator,
Collier's

In 1916, Adams, with Isaac Newton Phelps Stokes, produced a colorful redraft of the 1660 Castello Plan map of New York City.

References

External links

 
 
 

1874 births
1925 deaths
American illustrators
Art Students League of New York alumni
Deaths from appendicitis
Adams political family
Artists from Worcester, Massachusetts